Andrew A. McWilliams (October 16, 1916 – March 23, 1995) was a Canadian curler He played on the Billy Walsh rink that won two Brier Championships for Manitoba, in 1952 and 1956.

References

1995 deaths
Curlers from Manitoba
1916 births
Brier champions
Canadian male curlers